Abdul Salaam (born Larry Faulk; August 12, 1953) is a former American football player best remembered for his days as a defensive tackle with the New York Jets' famed "New York Sack Exchange."

College career
Salaam played baseball and basketball as well as football at Woodward High School in Cincinnati, Ohio. He majored in business at Kent State University, while also playing both nose guard and Linebacker with Kent State's "Carat Gold" defense. He earned first-team All-Mid-American Conference three straight seasons.

Professional career
Known as Larry Faulk when drafted by the New York Jets in the seventh round (188th overall) of the 1976 NFL Draft, he changed his name to Abdul Salaam, which means "soldier of peace," in 1977 because he wanted serenity in his life.

The Jets went just 3-11 each of Salaam's first two seasons in the National Football League, however, he was soon joined by Joe Klecko, Mark Gastineau and Marty Lyons on the Jets' defensive line to form one of the top defensive lines in the NFL, known as the "New York Sack Exchange." The four combined for 66 sacks in 1981 to lead the Jets to their first playoff game since 1969.

In November 1981, Salaam, Gastineau, Klecko and Lyons were invited to ring the ceremonial opening bell at the New York Stock Exchange that served as the inspiration for their nickname.

The Jets made the playoffs again in 1982, losing the AFC Championship game to the Miami Dolphins. The only game Salaam appeared in for the Jets in 1983 was the final game of the season, a 34–14 loss to the Dolphins in Miami that brought the Jets' record to 7–9. Following the season, he was traded with Kenny Neil to the San Diego Chargers for a 1984 NFL Draft second-round pick, but neither player ever made an appearance with his new team.

References

1953 births
Living people
People from New Brockton, Alabama
Players of American football from Alabama
Players of American football from Cincinnati
African-American players of American football
American football defensive linemen
Kent State Golden Flashes football players
New York Jets players
Woodward High School (Cincinnati, Ohio) alumni
21st-century African-American people
20th-century African-American sportspeople